The 2012 Senior Bowl was an all-star college football exhibition game featuring players from the 2011 college football season, and prospects for the 2012 Draft of the professional National Football League (NFL). The 63rd edition of the Senior Bowl was won by the North team, 23–13.

The game was played on January 28, 2012, at 3 pm CST (4 p.m. Eastern time) at Ladd–Peebles Stadium in Mobile, Alabama, between "North" and "South" teams. This year's Senior Bowl concluded the 2011-12 post-season as the NFLPA's Texas vs The Nation game, which would have been played the following week, was canceled.  The coaching staff of the Minnesota Vikings, led by head coach Leslie Frazier, coached the North team. The coaching staff of the Washington Redskins, led by head coach Mike Shanahan, coached the South team.

Coverage of the event was provided in high-definition on the NFL Network. Clothing company Nike was the sponsor for the first year, and provided apparel for the game.

Rosters

North Team

South Team

Game summary

Scoring summary

Statistics

References

Senior Bowl
Senior Bowl
Senior Bowl
Senior Bowl